General Elles may refer to:

Edmond Elles (1848–1934), British Army lieutenant general
Hugh Elles (1880–1945), British Army lieutenant general
William Elles (1837–1896), British Army lieutenant general

See also
General Ellis (disambiguation)